Artem Volodymyrovych Shpyryonok (born 30 July 2002) is a Ukrainian professional footballer who plays as a centre-forward for Ukrainian club Alians Lypova Dolyna.

References

External links
 Profile on Alians Lypova Dolyna official website
 
 

2002 births
Living people
Sportspeople from Sumy
Ukrainian footballers
Association football forwards
FC Alians Lypova Dolyna players
Ukrainian First League players
Ukrainian Second League players